Carabetovca is a village in Basarabeasca District, Moldova.

References

Villages of Basarabeasca District